Alvimiantha is a genus of flowering plants belonging to the family Rhamnaceae.

Its native range is Brazil.

Species:

Alvimiantha tricamerata

References

Rhamnaceae
Rhamnaceae genera